Cocom may refer to:

 The Cocom, a Mayan dynasty of Mayapan in the Yucatan
 CoCom, the Coordinating Committee for Multilateral Export Controls organized to restrict Western exports to COMECON countries
 COCOM (or CoCOM), the command relationship exercised over assigned forces by a Unified Combatant Command which is a United States joint military command that is composed of forces from two or more services and has a broad and continuing mission.
 COCOM A/S, a Danish cable modem company acquired by Cisco in 1999